A puppet ruler is a person who has a title indicating possession of political power, but who, in reality, is either loyal to or controlled by outside individuals or forces.  Such outside power can be exercised by a foreign government, in which case the puppet ruler's domain is called a puppet state.  But the puppet ruler may also be controlled by internal forces, such as non-elected officials.

Examples

In Latin America 
Governing through puppet presidents has long been a political tactic in Latin America. Many dictators and strongmen have formally handed over power to other officials for several reasons, often in order to follow constitutional provisions for elections and term limits, to provide a civilian façade for military rule, or to be able to go into semi-retirement away from the capital city. Strongmen who sometimes governed through figureheads included Diego Portales of Chile, Rafael Núñez of Colombia, Tomás Guardia Gutiérrez of Costa Rica, Fulgencio Batista of Cuba, Ulises Heureaux and Rafael Trujillo of the Dominican Republic, Gabriel García Moreno of Ecuador, Raoul Cédras of Haiti, Porfirio Díaz and Plutarco Elías Calles of Mexico, the Somoza family of Nicaragua, José Antonio Remón Cantera, Omar Torrijos and Manuel Noriega of Panama, Dési Bouterse of Suriname, and Antonio Guzmán Blanco and Juan Vicente Gómez of Venezuela. While figureheads who decided to act autonomously were often dismissed, on rare occasions the "puppets" later became significant political figures in their own right. For example, Lázaro Cárdenas turned against and exiled Calles to the United States and Joaquín Balaguer was elected to the Dominican presidency six times after the assassination of Trujillo.

In the United States 

A puppet does not have to be a national ruler.  For example, Oscar K. Allen was widely recognized to be Huey Long's puppet while serving as governor of Louisiana.

Some critics and members of the media claimed that former President George W. Bush was a puppet of his vice president, Dick Cheney. Shortly after Bush was elected in 2000, for example, Saturday Night Live ran a skit where Bush, played by Will Ferrell, laments that "Cheney's going to be one tough boss." However, these claims have likely been inflated. While Cheney had a strong influence on Bush and may have, at times, manipulated him, Cheney likely can not be considered a true puppet ruler.

Elsewhere 
In the years before and during World War II, Puyi, the deposed Emperor of China, is usually considered to have been the puppet ruler of Manchukuo, a client state of the Empire of Japan on the Chinese mainland.

Current (as of 2021) Prime Minister of Serbia Ana Brnabić, cited by political scientist Krzysztof Zuba as an example of a head of government with extensive political dependence on a leader of the governing party, has been described by opposition leaders and some observers as a puppet for President Aleksandar Vučić, whose office is constitutionally ceremonial with no significant executive power. Brnabić never denied this, and even said that Vučić should act as a "mentor" of the prime minister.

References 

Government
Politics